Sarala Birla Academy (SBA) is a boys-only independent boarding school in Bengaluru, Karnataka, India. It is located off Bannerghatta Road. It was founded in 2004. It follows the ICSE, IGCSE and IB Diploma program.

Boarding Houses 
The School has 4 houses Aditya, Bhaskar, Martand, Vivasvan. Each house has 100 Students and 2 House-Masters, and one House-Mother who meet the needs of the students residing in the house.

 Schools in Bangalore
 Boarding schools in Karnataka
 Educational institutions established in 2004
2004 establishments in Karnataka